Sthenodectes is a genus of brontothere endemic to North America.

References

Brontotheres
Eocene odd-toed ungulates
Eocene mammals of Asia
Fossil taxa described in 1912